Muse Sick-n-Hour Mess Age is the fifth studio album by American hip hop group Public Enemy, released on August 23, 1994, by Def Jam Recordings. The title is a reverse mondegreen of the phrase "music in our message" (emphasizing that their message is more important than the music, rather than the typical "message in our music"). Alternatively, it could be interpreted as "music and our message." The album debuted at number 14 on the US Billboard 200 chart, selling 56,000 copies in its first week.

The album's first single, "Give It Up", peaked at number 33 on the US Billboard Hot 100 in August 1994, and was the group's only American top 40 hit in their career.

Upon its release, Muse Sick-n-Hour Mess Age received generally mixed to positive reviews from most music critics, amid controversy among critics and fans over Public Enemy's relevance in hip hop at the time.

Critical reception

According to music journalist Neil Strauss, music critics initially accused Public Enemy of "being out of touch, of launching a weak attack against the trend toward gangster rap, of writing second-rate rhymes, of producing the album poorly, of using a bad pun for the title ('music in our message') and of being too old".

Spin (8/94, p. 84) - Highly Recommended - "Knee deep in the age of gangsta, at the anticlimactic millennial edge of a world already gone wrong, Public Enemy has dropped its latest."

Entertainment Weekly (8/26 - 9/2, p. 112) - "... it takes true guts to dis gangsta rap and to challenge the black community to confront its problems ..." - Rating: B

Q magazine (9/94, p. 106) - 4 Stars - Excellent - "Fact is, the lay off has just made Public Enemy sound fresh again ... because they've regained the wicked combination of sonic disturbance and loose, rabblerousing funk that drove classic jams like 911 is A Joke."

Alternative Press (9/94, pp. 80–81) - "Yeah, we've heard it before but Chuck can make waves even when he's treading water ... MESSAGE may be PE's most consistently enjoyable disc."

Vibe (8/94, p. 105) - "... a tour de force of densely constructed music and verbiage. Snippets of Stax-Volt grooves, reggae, soul, and metal bop and weave over gut-punching bass lines and wicked drumming while front man Chuck D lets fly with ... pronouncements, warnings, and accusations ..."

Melody Maker (8/20/94, p. 35) - Recommended - "This LP isn't just a stunning return to form for Public Enemy, it's perhaps the most powerful horrified answer to what you are doing to black culture yet."

NME (12/24/94, p. 22) - Ranked #20 in NME's list of the 'Top 50 Albums Of 1994.'

Commercial performance
Due to a change of the album's release date, negative reviews from publications such as Rolling Stone and The Source were published a month prior to the album's first sales week. In spite of this, the album performed well.  Muse Sick-n-Hour Mess Age debuted at number 14 on the US Billboard 200 chart, selling 56,000 copies its first week. This was more than most of Public Enemy's previous albums. The album quickly fell off the charts, as sales were negatively impacted by Def Jam's move from Sony Music to PolyGram during its release. On October 25, 1994, the album was certified gold by the Recording Industry Association of America (RIAA) for sales of over 500,000 copies in the United States.

Track listing
All songs were written or co-written by members of Public Enemy, except "Godd Complexx", which was written by Jalal Mansur Nuriddin a/k/a Alafia Pudim.

"Whole Lotta Love Goin on in the Middle of Hell" – 3:13
"Theatrical Parts" - 0:28
"Give It Up" – 4:31
"What Side You On?" – 4:07
"Bedlam 13:13" – 4:07
"Stop in the Name ..." - 1:21
"What Kind of Power We Got?" – 5:31
"So Whatcha Gone Do Now" – 4:41
"White Heaven/Black Hell" - 1:06
"Race Against Time" – 3:21
"They Used to Call It Dope" - 0:30
"Aintnuttin Buttersong" – 4:23
"Live and Undrugged, Parts 1 & 2" – 5:55
"Thin Line Between Law & Rape" – 4:45
"I Ain't Mad at All" – 3:25
"Death of a Carjacka" - 2:00
"I Stand Accused" – 3:57
"Godd Complexx" – 3:40
"Hitler Day" – 4:28
"Harry Allen's Interactive Super Highway Phone Call to Chuck D" - 2:55
"Livin in a Zoo (remix)" – 3:38

An extra track titled "Ferocious Soul" is included on the CD as a pregap hidden track.

Personnel 
Credits adapted from CD Universe.

 Flavor Flav – bass, keyboards, producer, rap vocals
 Chuck D. – liner notes, producer, rap vocals
 Terminator X – scratches
 Tom Costello – various instruments 
 Paul Reisch – various instruments
 Gerry Comito – guitar
 Darryl Dixon – horns
 David Watson – horns 
 Bill Mobley – horns
 Kerwin "Sleek" Young – bass, Producer 
 Nathaniel Townsley III – drums
 John B. Smooth – congas
 Hank Shocklee – producer
 Keith Shocklee – programming, background vocals, producer
 Gary G-Wiz – producer 
 Kamron – scratches
 Kevin Boone – scratches
 Tet – background vocals 
 Norma Jean Wright – background vocals
 Paulette McWilliams – background vocals
 Bemshi – background vocals

 Carl DeHaney – background vocals
 The Punk Barbarians – background vocals
 Grandell Thompson – background vocals
 Jamel Bazemore – background vocals
 Sean Chaplin – background vocals
 Victor Brownlee – background vocals
 Harry Allen – background vocals
 Errol Nazareth – background vocals
 Jesse Smith – background vocals
 Andre Guilty – background vocals
 Mike Williams – background vocals
 Akilah Watkins – background vocals
 Raymond Mattry – background vocals
 Sheila Cabllero – background vocals
 Jeanette Harrod – background vocals
 Prince Yellordy – background vocals
 Jean Victor – background vocals
 Nick Sansano – engineer
 Gerry Comito – engineer 
 Jimmy O'Neil – engineer

Charts

Weekly charts

Certifications

Notes

References

External links
 Muse Sick-n-Hour Mess Age at Discogs
 Album Review — By Spin

1994 albums
Public Enemy (band) albums
Def Jam Recordings albums
Albums produced by Easy Mo Bee